The Peace of Pressburg was signed in Pressburg (today Bratislava) on 26 December 1805 between French Emperor Napoleon Bonaparte and Holy Roman Emperor Francis II, as a consequence of the French victory over the Russians and Austrians at the Battle of Austerlitz (2 December). A truce was agreed on 4 December, and negotiations for the treaty began. The treaty was signed by Johann I Joseph, Prince of Liechtenstein, and the Hungarian Count Ignác Gyulay for the Austrian Empire and Charles Maurice de Talleyrand for France.

Beyond the clauses establishing "peace and amity" and the Austrian withdrawal from the Third Coalition, the treaty also mandated substantial territorial concessions by the Austrian Empire. The French gains of the previous treaties of Campo Formio and Lunéville were reiterated, while recent Austrian acquisitions in Italy and southern Germany were ceded to France and Bavaria, respectively. The scattered Austrian holdings in Swabia were passed to French allies – the King of Württemberg, and the Elector of Baden – while Bavaria received Tyrol and Vorarlberg. Austrian claims on those German states were renounced without exception. Venetia, Istria, and Dalmatia were incorporated into the Kingdom of Italy, of which Napoleon had become king earlier that year. Augsburg, previously an independent Free Imperial City, was ceded to Bavaria. As a minor compensation, the Austrian Empire annexed the Electorate of Salzburg, which had been under Habsburg rule since 1803. The elector, the Austrian Emperor's brother, was compensated with the Grand Duchy of Würzburg.

Emperor Francis II also recognized the kingly titles assumed by the Electors of Bavaria and Württemberg, which foreshadowed the end of the Holy Roman Empire. Within months of the signing of the treaty and after a new entity, the Confederation of the Rhine, had been created by Napoleon, Francis II renounced his title as Holy Roman Emperor. An indemnity of 40 million francs to France was also provided for in the treaty.

Notes

References

External links
Full text 

Pressburg, Peace of
Pressburg, Peace of
Pressburg, Peace of
Pressburg, Peace of
Pressburg, Peace of
Pressburg, Peace of
Pressburg, Peace of
Pressburg, Peace of
History of Bratislava
War of the Third Coalition
1805 in Europe
1805 in France
1805 in the Austrian Empire
History of Augsburg
France–Holy Roman Empire relations
December 1805 events
Francis II, Holy Roman Emperor